Ehab Mohamed (born 4 April 1957) is an Egyptian volleyball player. He competed in the men's tournament at the 1984 Summer Olympics.

References

1957 births
Living people
Egyptian men's volleyball players
Olympic volleyball players of Egypt
Volleyball players at the 1984 Summer Olympics
Place of birth missing (living people)